Ofek 324 is the IAF's operational technology unit. It is responsible for developing operational system programs and operation of the air force's computer systems. It also carries out research and development, cyber defense, and maintenance work.

The unit operates from three different IAF bases and is subordinate to the IAF Equipment Group. Its current head is Colonel Y. 

Ofek was established in December 2005, by merging two former IAF computing units, Unit 180 (founded 1959, responsible for combat support systems) and Mamdas (founded 1967, responsible operational systems).

The unit's first battle was about 6 months after its establishment, during the Second Lebanon War, under Colonel Asahel. In 2015, shifted focus to operational technology and intelligence.

The units emblem is made up of four components:
 The IAF wing emblem
 An owl - a determined animal capable of seeing far into the distance.
 A circular arrow target - related to its role of providing the IAF with significant operational capabilities
 A computer network - representing technology.

References

Israeli Air Force units